"After the World" is a song by Christian hard rock band Disciple from their 2006 album Scars Remain. It was released as a radio single in 2007, and became the year's 8th most played song on Christian contemporary hit radio. The song peaked at No. 18, their highest peaking single on the Hot Christian Songs chart. It lasted 20 weeks on the overall chart. The song is played in a D major key at 76 beats per minute.

The song was nominated for the "Rock/Contemporary Recorded Song of the Year" award at the 2008 Dove Awards.

Music video 
The music video for the single "After The World" was released on March 17, 2011.

Charts

Weekly charts

Year-end charts

Awards

In 2008, the song was nominated for a Dove Award for Rock/Contemporary Recorded Song of the Year at the 39th GMA Dove Awards.

References

2007 singles
Disciple (band) songs
2006 songs
Epic Records singles